Reece Donaldson (born 9 January 1994) is a Scottish footballer.  He has previously played for Raith Rovers and Peterhead.

Career
Donaldson joined Raith aged 14 as a member of their youth academy, from Edina Hibs youth team. He was promoted to the senior squad in June 2010, signing a full-time contract He made his first team debut aged 17, on 7 May 2011, as a substitute in Raith Rovers' 3–0 defeat against Partick Thistle in the Scottish First Division. Having firmly broken into the first team at the start of the following season, Donaldson was given a two-year contract extension confirming his stay until 2014. At the end of his contract he was released by the club.

Donaldson joined Peterhead on loan on 14 November 2013. He made his debut on 16 November 2013, as Peterhead drew 1–1 with East Stirlingshire. He scored his first goal on 7 December 2013, in a 3–1 win away at Clyde. His loan ended early when he was recalled by Raith Rovers on 31 December 2013.

After his release by Raith Rovers, Donaldson agreed a deal to sign for Peterhead on a permanent basis. At the end of the 2014–15 season, Donaldson was released by Peterhead and within a few days of leaving The Blue Toon, Donaldson signed for Scottish League Two side East Stirlingshire.

Donaldson had a loan spell at Linlithgow Rose in 2016-2017.

Career statistics

Honours
Raith Rovers
Scottish Challenge Cup: 2013–14

References

External links

1994 births
Footballers from Edinburgh
Living people
Scottish Football League players
Raith Rovers F.C. players
Peterhead F.C. players
East Stirlingshire F.C. players
Linlithgow Rose F.C. players
Association football defenders
Scottish footballers
Scottish Professional Football League players